Waitaha, an early Māori iwi, inhabited the South Island of New Zealand. They were largely absorbed via marriage and conquest - first by the  Ngāti Māmoe and then by Ngāi Tahu - from the 16th century onward. Today those of Waitaha descent are represented by the Ngāi Tahu iwi. Like Ngāi Tahu today, Waitaha was itself a collection of various ancient iwi. Kāti Rākai was said to be one of Waitaha's hapū.

History

Origins 
Waitaha's earliest ancestors are traditionally traced as arrivals from Te Patunui-o-āio in Eastern Polynesia aboard the  canoe (waka), of which Rākaihautū had been the captain. He was accompanied by his wife and son, Waiariki-o-āio and Te Rakihouia, the renowned  (astronomer) Matiti, Waitaa, and other kin of the Te Kāhui Tipua, Te Kāhui Roko, and Te Kāhui Waitaha iwi. When genealogies are interpreted with 25–30 years' worth of lifespan for at least 34 generations, these people are calculated to have lived in or around the 9th century at the latest, but this is not an entirely reliable way to trace earlier occupants of New Zealand.

A traditional story tells how Rākaihautū used Kapakitua, his adze, to cut a path through heavy fog on the canoe's voyage. Other traditional stories such as the story of Ngā Puna Wai Karikari o Rākaihautū (roughly translated as "The Flowing Water Diggings of Rākaihautū"), credit Rākaihautū with travelling down the Southern Alps to Foveaux Strait from Boulder Bank, digging up many great lakes and waterways with Tūwhakarōria - his magical  (digging stick), and filling them with food as he went. Te Rakihouia and Waitaa also journeyed down along the east coast as far south as the Clutha River. According to Sir Āpirana Ngata, it is "very doubtful" that Rākaihautū went south at all, saying specifically in an audio recording with John Te Herekiekie Grace:

Rākaihautū's descendants 
A daughter of Rākaihautū, Te Uhi-tataraiakoa, stayed behind in Te Patunui-o-āio, and became the great grandmother of Toi. Eight generations after Toi there lived Waitaha-nui and after him Waitaha-araki, after whom there came Hāwea-i-te-raki, and finally seven generations later lived Hotumāmoe from Hastings, the founding ancestor of Ngāti Māmoe. In addition, Te Kāhea was a fifth generation descendant of Toi, and Rāhiri was also a 16th generation descendant. Tūhaitara from Hastings, a famed Ngāi Tahu ancestress, was said to have some Ngāti Māmoe ancestry. Her husband Marukore was a local with Te Kāhea ancestry. Waiwhero and Hekeia were Waitaha chiefs, with Te Anau being the latter's granddaughter and Aparim-a being his mother. Otaraia was the name of another chief.

Waitaha's pā included O whitianga te ra ("place of the shining sun"), close to the southern end of Lake Te Anau a site at the Taerutu Lagoon near Woodend, a site at the mouth of Mata-au, a site in the Oamaru area, and a site around Lake Wakatipu.

This happened again to Kāti Māmoe when Ngāi Tahu conquered the South Island in the 17th and 18th centuries.

Latter day claim 

In 1995, a book by controversial author Barry Brailsford, Song of Waitaha: The Histories of a Nation, claimed that the ancestors of a "Nation of Waitaha" were the first inhabitants of New Zealand, three groups of people of different races, two of light complexion and one of dark complexion, who had arrived in New Zealand from an unspecified location in the Pacific Ocean, 67 generations before the book appeared.

Although a series of further books, web sites and events have addressed these claims, they have been widely disputed and dismissed by scholars. Historian Michael King noted: "There was not a skerrick of evidence – linguistic, artifactual, genetic; no datable carbon or pollen remains, nothing – that the story had any basis in fact. Which would make Waitaha the first people on earth to live in a country for several millennia and leave no trace of their occupation."

Organisations 
Several organisations have  as part of their title, often as a synonym for Canterbury or in a generic "ancient links to the land" sense. Some are:
 Waitaha Scout Group, based in Dunedin, Otago
 Waitaha Cultural Council, Christchurch-based performance group
 Canterbury/Waitaha District Council of the New Zealand Educational Institute
 University of Canterbury (Te Whare Wānanga o Waitaha)

Notable people 

 Taare Parata (1865–1918), politician
 Bob Whaitiri (1916–1996), community leader and soldier
 Harry Kent (cyclist) (1947–2021), former city councilor and gold medal racing cyclist

See also 

 
 Aoraki / Mount Cook
 Kahukura
 Waitaha penguin

References

Notes

References

External links 
 Waitangi Tribunal discussion
 Early claims of pre-Māori settlement by Waitaha
 Neo-imperialism and the (mis)appropriation of indigenousness, piece by Makere Harawira, critical of Brailsford
 Skeptic Society discussion of Brailsford claims

Waitaha (South Island iwi)
Iwi and hapū